Cefn Coed Colliery Halt railway station served the village of Crynant, in the historical county of Glamorganshire, Wales, from 1930 to 1962 on the Neath and Brecon Railway.

History 
The station was opened on 8 September 1930 by the Great Western Railway. It closed on 15 October 1962.

References 

Disused railway stations in Neath Port Talbot
Former Great Western Railway stations
Railway stations in Great Britain opened in 1930
Railway stations in Great Britain closed in 1962
1930 establishments in Wales
1962 disestablishments in Wales